Charles Herbert Christie (April 13, 1882 – October 1, 1955) and Alfred Ernest Christie (November 23, 1886 – April 14, 1951) were Canadian motion picture entrepreneurs.

Early life
Charles Herbert Christie was born between April 13, 1880 and April 13, 1882, and Alfred Ernest Christie was born between October 23, 1881 and November 23, 1886, both in London, Ontario. Their father managed the Opera House and their mother was its box-office manager and accountant. Charles graduated from school at age 14, and graduated from the four-year accountancy course in two years at age 16.

Career

Charles, at age 23, was offered a job as the stage manager for Liebler and Company and accepted it on the condition that his brother Al also be given a job. They worked for the organization for three years. Charles joined the film industry after being hired as an accountant for the Nestor Film Company. William Horsley stated that "I wonder if we would have survived as a viable industry had not Charles Christie arrived to put our finances in order". Al presented a few comedy scripts and was paid $15 for both of the one-reel ideas. Al aided in establishing the Nestor Film Company in Los Angeles in 1911, and Universal Pictures started distributing all of their films in 1913.

The Christie Film Company was formed on January 6, 1916, and Al purchased the Blondeau Tavern for $15,000. The company's films were distributed by Universal and Carl Laemmle gave it $5,000 to aid in its establishment. Al wanted the company to produce an equal amount of westerns and comedies, but Charles convinced him to focus on comedies. Charles was the vice-president and general manager of the company. They ended their distribution agreement with Universal and went to Educational Pictures in 1919. From 1927 to 1928, the company's films were distributed by Paramount Pictures and then by Columbia Pictures after Paramount cancelled its contract. Their films starred Betty Compson, Dorothy Devore, Lloyd Hamilton, Al St. John, Fay Tincher, and other actors.

Charles served as a director of the Motion Picture Relief Fund. He was a member of Robert M. Allan's campaign committee in 1925, while Allan was seeking reelection to the Los Angeles City Council. He succeeded Joseph M. Schenck as president of the Association of Motion Pictures Producers, a subsidiary of the Motion Picture Producers and Distributors of America, in 1925.

The Christies purchased the Metropolitan Studio in the 1920s and spent over $500,000 to soundproof it. Dangerous Females was the Christie's first sound film and they produced over fifty feature-length sound films in 1929. The Christie brothers were financially ruined after the Wall Street Crash of 1929. The brothers used bank loans to buy for real estate purchases and had $2.5 million in debts by 1932. The brothers liquidated their assets, but were $70,000 short of the amount owed. The Horsley brothers paid the remainder of the debts.

Charles started selling real estate while Al went to live in New York. Al established another film studio in 1932, with the backing of Atlas Corporation Studios and the Guaranty Trust Company. He produced thirty-two films until he decided to leave the film industry in 1941. The brothers reunited and Al managed entertainment at the Douglas Aircraft Company's factory in Santa Monica, which featured Lucille Ball, Milton Berle, Bing Crosby, Duke Ellington, Gracie Fields, Bob Hope, Betty Hutton, Glenn Miller, and James Stewart during Al's management.

Al stated that "Very few of our negatives or prints survived" as they "couldn't afford to keep that old emulsion film in the cold storage it needed to survive". Al produced over seven hundred films before his retirement.

Personal life
Al married Shirley Collins in 1911, but they later divorced. In 1925, the Christie brothers and their film company paid $31,654.43 in income taxes. Al retired following World War II and Charles retired in 1950. Al died in Beverly Hills, California, on April 14, 1951, three days after suffering a heart attack. Al only had $2,597, with $1,697 in cash and $900 in personal property, and it was inherited by Charles. Charles died in Beverly Hills, on October 1, 1955, and he gave his housekeeper of thirty years over $250,000 along with his house. She died in a car accident three months later.

Filmography

References

Works cited
 
 
 
 
 
 
 
 

20th-century American male writers
20th-century American screenwriters
20th-century Canadian male writers
20th-century Canadian screenwriters
Academy of Motion Picture Arts and Sciences founders
American film studio executives
Silent film producers
Silent film directors
Canadian film executives
Film directors from London, Ontario
Writers from London, Ontario
Burials at Hollywood Forever Cemetery
Canadian emigrants to the United States